Continental Airways was a passenger charter airline based in Moscow, Russia. It was established in 1995 and operated out of Sheremetyevo International Airport.

History

The airline was founded in 1995 as an exclusive cargo airline, operating 3 Tupolev Tu-154s. Its initial base was Vnukovo International Airport. In 2000, it acquired 3 Ilyushin Il-76TDs to increase its routes and expand its destinations. In 2004, they acquired 4 more Tu-154s to start their passenger service, which would make its first flight in 2005. 

After having financial problems for two years, selling several of his Il-76s and suspending most of their destinations, on 29 July 2011, the Russian Air Safety Agency revoked his permission to fly, and the next day, the airline declared bankruptcy, thus ceasing all its operations.

Destinations
Continental Airways served the following scheduled destinations: Abakan, Anapa, Barnaul, Bratsk, Blagoveshchensk, Cheliabinsk, Gelendzhik, Irkutsk, Kazan, Kemerovo, Komsomolsk-on-Amur, Krasnodar, Krasnoyarsk, Moscow, Murmansk, Nizhni Novgorod, Norilsk, Novokuznetsk, Petropavl, Rostov-on-Don, Samara, Sochi, Ufa, Vladivostok, Yakutsk, Yekaterinburg, and Yuzhno-Sakhalinsk.

Fleet

Continental Airways operated the following aircraft:

See also
List of defunct airlines of Russia

References

External links

 	

Companies based in Moscow
Airlines established in 1995
Airlines disestablished in 2011
Defunct airlines of Russia
Defunct companies of Russia